Michele Jeanette Sage Navarrete (born November 12, 1969 in Ciudad de Panamá Panamá) is a Panamanian beauty pageant contestant winner of the Señorita Panamá 1994 title. Also represented Panama in Miss Universe 1995, the 44th Miss Universe pageant was held at Windhoek Country Club Resort, in Windhoek, Namibia on May 12, 1995. She was 18 in preliminaries.

She represented Panamá Centro state.

References

External links
 Señorita Panamá  official website

1969 births
Living people
Miss Universe 1995 contestants
Panamanian beauty pageant winners
Señorita Panamá